Sardasht Rural District is a rural district (dehestan) in Sardasht District, Dezful County, Khuzestan Province, Iran. In a 2006 census its population was 4,851, in 886 families.  The rural district has 59 villages.

References 

Rural Districts of Khuzestan Province
Dezful County